Western Mail is a 1942 American Western film directed by Robert Emmett Tansey and starring Tom Keene and Fred Kohler, Jr.

Plot
Lucky Webster (Fred Kohler, Jr.), a member of the Rivers gang, is uneasy that they have been stealing U.S. mail when robbing trains. Tom Allen (Tom Keene) is undercover and working with Sheriff Big Bill Collins (Glenn Strange) to capture and arrest the gang. Julia Webster (Jean Trent) is concerned about her brother. Lopez Mendoza (Frank Yaconelli) provides some humor as Tom's sidekick.

Cast 
Tom Keene as Tom Allen
Frank Yaconelli as Lopez Mendoza
LeRoy Mason as Jeff Gordon
Jean Trent as Julia Webster
Fred Kohler, Jr. as Lucky Webster
Glenn Strange as Sheriff Big Bill Collins
Gene Alsace as Henchman Rod
James Sheridan as Henchman Cheyenne
Karl Hackett as Jim Rivers

References

External links 

1942 films
Monogram Pictures films
1942 Western (genre) films
1940s English-language films
American black-and-white films
American Western (genre) films
Films directed by Robert Emmett Tansey
1940s American films